Frank Murphy (1890–1949) was a governor of Michigan and later justice of the United States Supreme Court.

Frank Murphy may also refer to:

Arts and entertainment
Frank Murphy (architect) (1916–1993), Irish architect
Frank Murphy (radio personality) (fl. 1980s–present), American radio producer / deejay
Frank Murphy, fictional character from the 1983 film Blue Thunder
Frank Murphy, fictional character in the 2003 film Pullin' the Devil by the Tail
Frank Murphy, fictional character in the American television series F Is for Family

Politics and law
Frank Reid Murphy (1844–1892), Australian politician, member of the Queensland Legislative Assembly
B. Frank Murphy (1867–1938), U.S. representative from Ohio
Frank Murphy (Michigan legislator) (1878–?), American politician, Michigan state representative
Frank Murphy (public servant) (1893–1949), Australian public servant
Frank E. Murphy (1896–?), American politician, Michigan state representative
Frank Murphy (lieutenant governor) (1897–1944), American politician, lieutenant governor of Michigan
Frank Murphy Jr. (born 1934), American politician, California state assemblyman

Sports
Frank Murphy (baseball) (1876–1912), American Major League Baseball player
Frank Murphy (pole vaulter) (1889–1980), American pole vaulter
Frank Murphy (footballer, born 1900) (1900–1953), Australian rules footballer for Carlton and Hawthorn
Frank Murphy (Australian rules footballer) (1905–1995), Australian rules footballer for Collingwood
Frank Murphy (footballer, born 1915) (1915–1984), Scottish footballer for Celtic
Frank Murphy (sports administrator) (born 1944), Irish athletic administrator
Frank Murphy (runner) (1947–2017), Irish middle-distance runner
Frank Murphy (footballer, born 1959), Scottish footballer for Kettering and Nuneaton
Frank Murphy (gridiron football) (born 1977), American NFL football player
Frank Murphy (rugby union) (born 1981), Irish rugby union player

Others
Frank E. Murphy (farmer) (fl. early 1900s), American businessman in Wisconsin who developed Murphy Farms Number 1

See also 
Francis Murphy (disambiguation)
Franklin Murphy (disambiguation)